is a Japanese actress from Tokyo. Since a child, she has been a member of the Japanese Theatrical Company Gekidan Wakakusa, of which she has joined in 1953. She played the young girl Otoyo in Akira Kurosawa's Red Beard (1965).

Selected filmography

Film
 Keisatsu Nikki aka Policeman's Diary (1955)
 Ruri no Kishi (1956)
 Enraptured (1961)
 Red Beard (1965)
 Karafuto 1945 Summer Hyosetsu no Mon (1974)
 La Seine no Hoshi aka Star of the Seine (1975)
 Gowappa 5 Gōdam (1976)
 Hasami Otoko aka The Man Behind the Scissors (2005)
 Mifune: The Last Samurai (2015)

Television
 Taikōki (1965), Ohatsu

Dubbing
 The Diary of Anne Frank, Anne Frank (Millie Perkins)
 To Kill with Intrigue, Ting Chan Yen (Hsu Feng)

References

External links
 Official website (archive) 
 Official agency profile at Sachiko Pro 

 Terumi Niki at Game Plaza Haruka Voice Artist Database 

1949 births
Living people
Actresses from Tokyo
Japanese child actresses